John Burdett (16 August 1888 — 16 April 1974) was an English cricketer. He was a right-handed batsman who played for Leicestershire. He was born in Blaby and died in Melton Mowbray.

Burdett made a single first-class appearance for the team, against Northamptonshire in 1919. From the middle order, he scored a duck in the first innings in which he batted, and a single run in the second.

External links
John Burdett at CricketArchive 

1888 births
1974 deaths
English cricketers
Leicestershire cricketers
People from Blaby
Cricketers from Leicestershire